Matilde Ibáñez Tálice (Buenos Aires, Argentina, 3 March 1907 – Montevideo, 4 September 2002) was a First Lady of Uruguay from 1947 until 1951 as the wife of former President Luis Batlle Berres. Ibáñez is also the mother of Jorge Batlle Ibáñez, who served as president from 2000 until 2005. 

Born in Argentina to León Ibáñez Saavedra (Argentine, relative of Cornelio Saavedra) and Elvira Tálice Parodi (Uruguayan). In 1926 she married the young politician Luis Batlle Berres, they had three children: Jorge (future President of Uruguay), Luis and Matilde. During the dictatorship of Gabriel Terra, the Batlle-Ibáñez family had to go to exile in Argentina.

In 1947, her husband assumed as Vice President of Uruguay; the early death of President Tomás Berreta meant that Batlle Berres was sworn in as President, and Ibáñez became First Lady.

Half a century later, her son Jorge was elected President of Uruguay (2000–2005). She died in 2002 and was buried at the Central Cemetery, Montevideo.

References

1907 births
2002 deaths
People from Buenos Aires
Argentine people of Uruguayan descent
Argentine emigrants to Uruguay
First Ladies of Uruguay
Burials at the Central Cemetery of Montevideo